The 1994–95 Tunisian Ligue Professionnelle 1 season was the 69th season of top-tier football in Tunisia.

Results

League table

Result table

References
1994–95 Ligue 1 on RSSSF.com

Tunisian Ligue Professionnelle 1 seasons